Crystallichthys matsushimae is a species of snailfish native to the northwestern Pacific Ocean. This species can grows up to a length of  TL.

References

Liparidae
Fish described in 1902